The endless knot or eternal knot is a symbolic knot and one of the Eight Auspicious Symbols. It is an important symbol in Hinduism, Jainism and Buddhism. It is an important cultural marker in places significantly influenced by Tibetan Buddhism such as Tibet, Mongolia, Tuva, Kalmykia, and Buryatia. It is also found in Celtic, Kazakh and Chinese symbolism.

History 
The endless knot appears on clay tablets from the Indus Valley civilization (2500 BC) and on a historic era inscription.

Interpretations

Buddhism
Various Buddhist interpretations of the symbol are:

 The endless knot iconography symbolised Samsara i.e., the endless cycle of suffering of birth, death and rebirth within Tibetan Buddhism.
 The inter-twining of wisdom and compassion.
 Interplay and interaction of the opposing forces in the dualistic world of manifestation, leading to their union, and ultimately to harmony in the universe.
 The mutual dependence of religious doctrine and secular affairs.
 The union of wisdom and method.
 The inseparability of emptiness (shunyata) and dependent origination, the underlying reality of existence.
 The link between ancestors and omnipresence represented by the etymology of Tantra, Yoga and religion) (see Namkha.)
 The wisdom of the Buddha as neither are said to have a beginning or end.

Hinduism
In Hinduism, Srivatsa is mentioned as 'connected to shree', i.e the goddess Lakshmi. It is a mark on the chest of Vishnu where his consort Lakshmi resides. According to the Vishnu purana, the tenth avatar of Vishnu, Kalki, will bear the Shrivatsa mark on his chest. It is one of the names of Vishnu in the Vishnu Sahasranamam. Srivatsa is considered to be auspicious symbol in Andhra Pradesh, Telangana, Tamil Nadu and Karnataka.

Jainism
In Jainism it is one of the eight auspicious items, an asthamangala, however found only in the Svetambara sect. It is often found marking the chests of the 24 tirthankaras. It is more commonly referred to as the Shrivatsa.

Logo 
A stylized version of the endless knot is the logo of China Unicom.

See also 

74 knot
 Ashtamangala (also known as Eight Auspicious Symbols)
 Celtic knot
 Chinese knotting
 Eternal return
 Gordian knot
 Indra's net
 Islamic interlace patterns
 Khachkars – Armenian knotwork
 Knot garden
 Knot theory
 Mandala
 Möbius strip
 Namkha
 Oseberg style
 Ouroboros
 Pan Chang knot
 Solomon's knot
 Tantra
 Three hares
 Trefoil knot
 Triquetra
 Turk's head knot
 Valknut
 Yin and yang

Notes and references

External links 

 "The Endless Knot (Skt. shrivatsa; Tib. dpal be'u)", TwilightBridge.com.
 "Endless Knot", ReligionFacts.com.

Buddhist symbols
Chinese art
Decorative knots
Mythological knots
Visual motifs

ta:ஸ்ரீவத்சம்